Elene Raukh (born 30 June 2002) is a Georgian footballer who plays as a defender and has appeared for the Georgia women's national team.

Career
Raukh has been capped for the Georgia national team, appearing for the team during the UEFA Women's Euro 2021 qualifying cycle.

References

External links
 
 

2002 births
Living people
Women's footballers from Georgia (country)
Georgia (country) women's international footballers
Women's association football defenders